Ctrl (2012) is the seventh solo studio album release from singer and songwriter Derek Webb. He produced it with Joshua Moore, who also co-produced Webb's 2009 album, Stockholm Syndrome.

Ctrl tells the story of an unnamed protagonist who, disenchanted with physical human life, sets out to develop a vision of immortality and life free of pain by ultimately uploading his consciousness into a digital virtual reality. As Webb explains it, "It's an album about one man's desire for something he cannot have because it isn't real, the journey he goes on pursuing it, and the costs of that journey. But essentially, 'Ctrl' is both personal autopsy and cultural observation about how we use technology to try and control our lives, and my concern that it could ultimately have more control of us."

Background
Webb co-wrote the story behind Ctrl with co-producer and fellow Caedmon's Call member Josh Moore, and television writer and producer Allan Heinberg. The resulting short story that accompanies the album was made available for free on his website.

Music and lyrics
Ctrl is simultaneously an adventurous movement forward in musical style and a return to the acoustic guitar for Webb after an extended absence. Ctrl combines a few unique musical elements to create a sonic landscape that reflects the feeling urgency and alienation of the story. Along with his vocals and nylon-string classical guitar, Webb and Moore interspersed drum machines and dense electronic effects.

Most notably, throughout, Ctrl features old recordings of Sacred Harp singing, an historical tradition of sacred choral music from the Southern United States related to Shape note singing. Sacred Harp is characterized by direct, expressive and sometimes brash voices in 4-part harmony. The juxtaposition of musical elements is fully intended to bring about the overall effect of the album.

Critical reception

Track listing

Personnel 

 Derek Webb – producer, performer, recording at Wellhouse Studios, Cedar Hill, Texas, story, art direction
 Joshua Moore – producer, performer, recording, story, mixing at The Moore House, back cover photography
 Allan Heinberg – story
 Travis Brockway – engineer at Ft. Sumner Studio, Nashville, Tennessee
 Matt Reynolds – production assistant
 Latifah Phillips – additional vocals
 Dave Wilton – additional vocals engineer at St. Ida's, Lafayette, Colorado
 Bob Boyd – mastering at Ambient Digital<, Houston, Texas
 McKenzie Smith – live drums
 Jordan Brooke Hamlin – woodwinds, vibraphone,  woodwinds and vibraphone engineer at Gingerwood Studio, Nashville, Tennessee
 Jon Dicus – design
 Josh Oakes – cover design
 Jon Dicus – cover design
 Zach McNair – inside portrait photography
 David McCollum – inside photo photography

Charts

References

2012 albums
Derek Webb albums